Chalvey Sports Football Club is a football club based in the Chalvey area of Slough, England.

History
The club was founded in 1885. In 1954 they joined Division One of the Great Western Combination, which they won at the first attempt, earning promotion to the Premier Division. They left the league at the end of the 1958–59 season, subsequently playing in the Slough & District League. During their time in the league they won the Norfolkian Senior Cup and the Slough Senior Cup.

In 1992 the Slough & District League merged into the East Berkshire League, with Chalvey placed in Division One. They were Division One champions in 1992–93 and were promoted to the Premier Division. In 1996–97 they were Premier Division champions. The club won the League Cup in 2012–13. In 2016 they transferred to Division Two East of the Hellenic League. After winning the division in 2016–17 and 2017–18, the club were promoted to Division One East. At the end of the 2020–21 season they were transferred to Division One of the Combined Counties League.

Ground
The club were based at the Garibaldi Pub  during the 1980s, before moving to Chalvey Working Men’s Club, changing the club name to Chalvey W.M.C. Sports. The club relocated to Arbour Park, the home ground of Slough Town, in 2017. In 2021 they moved to Burnham's 1878 Stadium.

Honours
Hellenic League
Division Two East champions, 2016–17, 2017–18
East Berkshire League
Premier Division champions 1996–97
Division One champions 1992–93
League Cup winners 1994–95, 2001–02, 2012–13
Great Western Combination
Division One champions 1954–55
Norfolkian Senior Cup
Winners 1964-65, 1971,72, 1998-99
Slough Town Senior Cup
Winners 1956–57
Ascot & Fielden Cup
Winners 2003–04

Records
Best FA Vase performance: First qualifying round, 2019–20

References

External links
Official website

Association football clubs established in 1885
1885 establishments in England
Football clubs in England
Football clubs in Berkshire
Sport in Slough
Great Western Combination
East Berkshire Football League
Hellenic Football League
Combined Counties Football League